General elections were held in Fiji between 8 and 15 May 1999. They were the first election held under the revised Constitution of 1997, which instituted a new electoral system and resulted in Mahendra Chaudhry taking office as Fiji's first Indo-Fijian Prime Minister.

Results
Mahendra Chaudhry's Fiji Labour Party won all 19 Indo-Fijian seats, annihilating the National Federation Party which had traditionally been Fiji's dominant Indo-Fijian party; Indo-Fijian voters were angered by the NFP's decision to enter into an electoral coalition agreement with the Soqosoqo ni Vakavulewa ni Taukei of Prime Minister Sitiveni Rabuka, whom they had not forgiven for leading the military coup that removed an Indo-Fijian dominated government from power in 1987.  In addition to the 19 Indo-Fijian seats, the Labour Party won 18 of the 25 "open electorates" for a total of 37 - an absolute majority in the 71-member House.  The Fijian Association Party, led by Adi Kuini Speed (the widow of former Prime Minister Timoci Bavadra), won 11 seats (10 ethnic Fijian and 1 open) against only 8 seats (5 ethnic Fijian and 3 open) for the Fijian Political Party, which had ruled the country since 1992.  The Christian Democratic Alliance won 3 seats (2 ethnic Fijian and one open), while Apisai Tora's Party of National Unity won four ethnic Fijian seats.  The United General Party won one "general" and one open electorate.  The remaining six seats (two ethnic Fijian, two "general electorates," one Rotuman, and one open) were won by minor parties and independents.

Aftermath
Many ethnic Fijians were unwilling to accept the result of the election, which was partly because their own votes had been so fragmented while those of Indo-Fijians had been much more united. President and "father of the nation" Ratu Sir Kamisese Mara worked behind the scenes, however, to persuade the main ethnic Fijian parties in parliament to accept Labour Party leader Mahendra Chaudhry as Prime Minister.  To appease ethnic Fijians, Chaudhry gave 11 of the 18 Cabinet posts to native Fijian politicians. Following the power-sharing provisions of the Constitution, the Cabinet was composed of members of numerous political parties.

Not all ethnic Fijians were appeased, however. Simmering resentment exploded on 19 May 2000, when George Speight stormed the parliament buildings and kidnapped most members of the government, including Chaudhry in a coup.

References

External links
Constituency results Psephos

Elections in Fiji
General
Fiji
Fiji